JDTic is a selective, long-acting ("inactivating") antagonist of the κ-opioid receptor (KOR). JDTic is a 4-phenylpiperidine derivative, distantly related structurally to analgesics such as pethidine and ketobemidone, and more closely to the MOR antagonist alvimopan. In addition, it is structurally distinct from other KOR antagonists such as norbinaltorphimine. JDTic has been used to create crystal structures of KOR [ ].

Pharmacology
JDTic is a long-acting ("inactivating") antagonist of the KOR, and is reported to be highly selective for the KOR over the μ-opioid receptor (MOR), δ-opioid receptor (DOR), and nociceptin receptor (NOP). However, in another study, JDTic showed little selectivity over the μ-opioid receptor, though it failed to block the effects of the selective μ-opioid receptor agonist sufentanil across a wide range of doses in animals. It has a very long duration of action, with effects in animals seen for up to several weeks after administration of a single dose, although its binding to the KOR is not technically "irreversible" and its long-acting effects are instead caused by altered activity of c-Jun N-terminal kinases.

Animal studies suggest that JDTic may produce antidepressant, anxiolytic, and anti-stress effects, as well as having possible application in the treatment of addiction to cocaine and morphine. JDTic shows robust activity in animal models of depression, anxiety, stress-induced cocaine relapse, and nicotine withdrawal.

Discontinuation of clinical development
During phase I human clinical trials for the treatment of cocaine abuse, development of JDTic was halted due to the occurrence of non-sustained ventricular tachycardia, a type of arrhythmia that can potentially be life-threatening. In addition, JDTic showed an unfavorable brain-to-plasma concentration ratio, indicating poor central nervous system penetration. As a result, new KOR antagonists with more favorable drug profiles (e.g., short-acting, improved brain penetration, etc.), such as ALKS-5461 (a combination of buprenorphine and samidorphan) and CERC-501 (formerly LY-2456302), are being developed instead.

The discontinuation of the clinical development of JDTic is detailed in the following important literature quote:

In the same paper, LY-2456302 (now CERC-501) was described, "The LY2456302 compound developed by Eli Lilly is an example of a KOR antagonist that does not strongly activate JNK. In a recent phase 1 trial of LY2456302, the authors concluded that the drug was well-tolerated with no clinically significant findings (Lowe et al, 2014)." Note that KOR antagonists that strongly activate JNK are inactivating (long-acting) while those that do not are non-inactivating (short-acting), and that inactivating KOR antagonists are more "complete" and hence potentially more risky inhibitors of the KOR than are non-inactivating antagonists.

See also
 κ-Opioid receptor § Antagonists
 List of investigational antidepressants

References

4-Phenylpiperidines
Carboxamides
Delta-opioid receptor antagonists
Irreversible antagonists
Kappa-opioid receptor antagonists
Mu-opioid receptor antagonists
Phenols
Synthetic opioids
Tetrahydroisoquinolines